Acleris placidus is a species of moth of the family Tortricidae. It is found in Japan (Honshu).

The wingspan is 22–28 mm.

References

Moths described in 1980
placidus
Moths of Japan